KGU-FM (99.5 MHz) is a commercial radio station in Honolulu, Hawaii, broadcasting a Christian talk and teaching radio format. It is owned by the Salem Media Group with studios and offices on North King Street in Honolulu's Kalihi district.  KGU-FM is a brokered programming station where hosts pay for their time on the air and may use their shows to seek donations to their ministries.  National religious leaders heard on KGU-FM include David Jeremiah, Jim Daly, Charles Stanley, J. Vernon McGee and Chuck Swindoll.  Several Honolulu pastors also have shows on the station.

KGU-FM has an effective radiated power of 100,000 watts horizontal polarization and 81,000 watts vertical.  Its transmitter is off Palehua Road in Akupu, Hawaii.

History

Japanese tourism and Hawaiian AC
The original call sign was KORL. It had a Japanese tourist information format. In 1999, the station switched to Hawaiian Adult Contemporary music. In 2002, it added the moniker "The Breeze" and changed call letters to KHUI.

In 2003, KHUI became the first station in the United States to play a Variety Hits format when it brought Bob FM to the Honolulu radio market.  But the format didn't score well in the Arbitron ratings and only lasted a year.

Salem ownership
In 2004, the Salem Media Group bought the station and reinstated "The Breeze" Hawaiian AC format that same year. In November 2006, KHUI switched formats to soft oldies and adult standards, branded as "The Jewel."  It used the satellite-fed service "America's Best Music" from Dial Global (now Westwood One).  America's Best Music was previously heard in the market from 1995 to 2001 on KUMU 1500 AM.

On December 26, 2010, KHUI flipped from Adult Standards to a simulcast of Salem's Christian Talk sister station KGU 760 AM.  The call letters switched to KGU-FM to match the call sign on 760 AM. 

The simulcast ended on February 1, 2011, when the AM station flipped to Business Talk.  That left KGU-FM with the Christian talk and teaching format.  (KGU 760 is now a sports radio station.)

Former logos

References

External links
 KGU-FM official website
 

Christianity in Honolulu
GU-FM
Radio stations established in 1992
1992 establishments in Hawaii
Salem Media Group properties
GU-FM
Talk radio stations in the United States